is a Japanese manga artist from Miyazaki Prefecture, born on 5 September 1970. His most known works are the series Eat-Man, which consisted of 19 volumes, and Ray, which consisted of 7 volumes. Eat-Man and Blue Drop have been adapted into anime series. Yoshitomi has also worked on many one-shot manga with yuri content.

Works 
  (1991, 3 volumes)
  (1993, 5 volumes)
 Eat-Man (1996 – 2002, 19 volumes)
 Ray (2002 – 2005, 7 volumes)
 Avenger (2003, manga adaptation)
  (2004 – 2008)
 Black Jack - Yoshitomi Akihito edition (2005)
  Ray+ (2006, 1 volume) 
  Gate Runner (2006, 2 volumes)
  (2009, 6 volumes)
  (2009, 6 volumes)
  (2010 – 2014, 2 volumes)
  (2013 – 2017, 5 volumes)
  (2015 – 2016)
 Eat-Man: The Main Dish (May 2014 – August 2019, 4 volumes)
  (July 2018 – February 2019, 1 volume)
  (October 2019 – present)
  (March 2020 – present)

YouTube content format 
Yoshitomi regularly uploads videos to his YouTube channel, and adheres to posting his drawing process (both real-time and time-lapsed), and much more recently, creation of his manga 24-ku no Hanako-san currently serialized in Champion Red.

References

External links
 RAKUGAKI-3X
 

Manga artists from Miyazaki Prefecture
Living people
Year of birth missing (living people)